In mathematics, the Kadison–Kastler metric is a metric on the space of C*-algebras on a fixed Hilbert space. It is the Hausdorff distance between the unit balls of the two C*-algebras, under the norm-induced metric on the space of all bounded operators on that Hilbert space.

It was used by Richard Kadison and Daniel Kastler to study the perturbation theory of von Neumann algebras.

Formal definition

The above notion of distance defines a metric on the space of C*-algebras which is called the Kadison-Kastler metric.

References

C*-algebras